Jinnah Stadium, Sialkot, formerly known as Connelly Park or Jinnah Park, is a cricket ground located in Sialkot. It is one of the oldest cricket ground in Pakistan.

History
The stadium was founded in 1909 during the British Raj. It was named "Connelly Park" after the then British Deputy Commissioner of Sialkot Mr. Connelly. In the 1950s it was named Jinnah Park. In 1979 it was upgraded into a stadium with new pavilion and seating and was renamed Jinnah Stadium. It was the home ground of Sialkot Stallions.

The first Test here was played in 1985 and the last in 1995. Pakistan played its first ever ODI at home on this ground in 1976 against New Zealand. It was also New Zealand's first ODI against Pakistan. Jinnah Stadium is known for its green-top pitches that help fast bowlers. And credit of these green top pitches goes to Curator Abdul Ghani who has prepared pitches for all international matches played here (4 Tests and 9 ODIs). The stadium has a lot of memories attached with it.

In 1984, Pakistan-India ODI here was stopped midway and abandoned after news of the assassination of the then Indian PM, Indira Gandhi, reached the ground. India were batting.

During the India tour to Pakistan in 1989, the 4th test of the series played on this stadium. During the India's batting of the 2nd innings, Sachin Tendulkar was badly injured by a Waqar Younis bouncer, however, he came back later to bat and scored a key 57 runs to save the test match and a series for India.

On this stadium, Indian cricket team scored its lowest team total of 79 in its ODI history against Pakistan on 1978/79 tour. The stadium has hosted 9 one day internationals and 4 test matches.

In 2016, Sialkot Cricket Academy was established at the stadium.

In September 2019, the Pakistan Cricket Board named it as one of the venues to host matches in the 2019–20 Quaid-e-Azam Trophy.

Records

Test 
 Highest Team Total: Pakistan 423/5d v Sri Lanka 12 Dec 1991
 Lowest Team Total:  Sri Lanka 157 v Pakistan 27 Oct 1985
 Highest Individual Score:Moin Khan Pakistan vs Sri Lanka 22 Sep 1995
 Highest Partnership: Saleem Malik and Imran Khan 132, Pakistan vs Sri Lanka 1991
 Best Bowling:Ravi Ratnayeke Sri Lanka 8/83 27 Oct 1985

One Day International 
 Highest team total: 277/9     Pakistan v New Zealand 6 Dec 1996 
 Lowest team total: 79      India v Pakistan 13 Oct 1978
 Highest individual score:114 Rameez Raja Pakistan v New Zealand  6 Nov 1990      
 Highest partnership:Saeed Anwar and Zahoor Elahi 177 (1st)  Pakistan v New Zealand 6 Dec 1996 
 Best Bowling:Waqar Younis 5/16 Pakistan v New Zealand 6 Nov 1990

List of Centuries

Key
 * denotes that the batsman was not out.
 Inns. denotes the number of the innings in the match.
 Balls denotes the number of balls faced in an innings.
 NR denotes that the number of balls was not recorded.
 Parentheses next to the player's score denotes his century number at Edgbaston.
 The column title Date refers to the date the match started.
 The column title Result refers to the player's team result

Test Centuries

This is the list of centuries scored in Test matches at Jinnah Stadium, Sialkot

One Day Internationals
Only one One-day international century has been scored at Jinnah Stadium, Sialkot

List of Five Wicket Hauls

Key

Tests
This is a list of five-wicket hauls taken at Jinnah Stadium, Sialkot in Test matches.

One Day Internationals
This is a list of five-wicket hauls taken at Jinnah Stadium, Sialkot in One-day Internationals.

See also
List of Test cricket grounds
 List of stadiums in Pakistan
 List of cricket grounds in Pakistan
 List of sports venues in Karachi
 List of sports venues in Lahore
 List of sports venues in Faisalabad

References

External links
 Sialkot Cricket

Sports venues in Pakistan
Test cricket grounds in Pakistan
Buildings and structures in Sialkot
Cricket grounds in Pakistan
1920 establishments in British India
Sport in Sialkot
Memorials to Muhammad Ali Jinnah